The Tour du Rwanda is a cycling event created in 1988 and based in Rwanda. The event is a cycling stage race that is organized by the Rwanda Cycling Federation (FERWACY). The event has been part of the UCI Africa Tour as a category 2.1-rated event since 2009.

Winners

External links

UCI Africa Tour races
Cycle races in Rwanda
Recurring sporting events established in 1988